John, referred to as John the Tyrant and sometimes given the nickname Stotzas the Younger (Latin: Stutias Iunior) after his predecessor, Stotzas, was a Berber military leader and briefly King of the Mauro-Roman Kingdom following the death of his predecessor. Given his name, Ioannes, John was probably, like Stotzas, of Eastern Roman descent and only briefly commanded his army against the Eastern Roman Empire.

After the defeat of Stotzas, John was chosen by the combined Berber-Eastern Roman rebel army and he supported the Vandal restoration attempt of dux Numidiae Guntarith, who seized the province of Africa proconsularis in spring 546 and killed the imperial governor Aerobindus in Carthage. When Guntarith began to consolidate his regime with purges and mass executions, the strategos Artabanes managed to have Guntarith assassinated just five weeks after the rebellion began. John, who had taken refuge in a church, was arrested by Artabanes and sent in chains to Constantinople, where he was said to have been crucified.

References

Citations

Bibliography 

 
 

546 deaths
6th-century Byzantine people
Byzantine rebels
Mauro-Roman Kingdom
Monarchs of the Mauro-Roman Kingdom
Executed monarchs
People executed by crucifixion